Juandré Christiaan Digue (born 9 May 1995 in Somerset West, South Africa) is a South African rugby union player who most recently played for the . His regular position is loosehead prop.

Career

Youth

He represented them as early as primary school level when he played at the 2008 Under-13 Craven Week tournament held in Paarl.

In 2013, he represented the Eagles at the high school equivalent for the Under-18 Craven Week in Polokwane. He also made five appearances for the  team in the 2013 Under-19 Provincial Championship, helping them reach the semi-final of the competition.

In 2014, he represented the SWD Under-19 team, starting six of their seven matches in the 2014 Under-19 Provincial Championship since they missed out on the play-offs on this occasion.

SWD Eagles

Despite still being in the Under-20 age group in 2015, he became involved with the  senior squad. He was included in their squad for the 2015 Vodacom Cup, but did not appear in any matches. Digue played a single match for the  side in the 2015 Under-21 Provincial Championship Group B before rejoining the first team for their Currie Cup First Division campaign. He helped them to four wins out of four, to end the competition in third position on the log to qualify for the semi-finals.

Although Digue wasn't included in the original group of players, he joined the training squad a week later. However, he returned to SWD Eagles after he failed to be contracted for the Super Rugby side.

Statistics

References

South African rugby union players
Living people
1995 births
People from Somerset West
Rugby union props
SWD Eagles players
Rugby union players from the Western Cape